Phelsuma malamakibo is a species of gecko endemic to the Anosy Region of Madagascar.

References

Phelsuma
Endemic fauna of Madagascar
Reptiles of Madagascar
Reptiles described in 2000